Spiris is a genus of tiger moths in the family Erebidae erected by Jacob Hübner in 1819.

Species
 Spiris slovenica (Daniel, 1939)
 Spiris striata (Linnaeus, 1758)
 Spiris bipunctata (Staudinger, 1892)

References

Callimorphina
Moth genera